The Garden of Cultivation is one of the best preserved examples of a Ming Dynasty classical garden in Suzhou. It is part of the Classical Gardens of Suzhou on UNESCO's World Heritage Site list. "Due to its special history, this Garden was virtually unknown before it was listed as a UN World Cultural Heritage site."

History 
The Garden of Cultivation was built in 1541 CE by Yuan Zugeng (袁祖庚, 1519–1590), at that time it was called the Hall of Delights.  In 1620 CE it was purchased by Wen Zhenmeng (1574-1638), grandson of the Wen Zhengming the designer of the Humble Administrator's Garden, "a celebrated master painter in China's history, and [who] served as the prime minister in the late Ming Dynasty".  Wen Zhenmeng rebuilt the garden and renamed it Herb Garden (yaopu).  In 1659 CE, It was rebuilt again by Jiang Cai, "a respected scholar and minister of Foreign Affairs during the late Ming Dynasty, who protested against corruption by exiling himself" and renamed Jingting Mountain Villa.  Jiang Cai added a grove of fig trees.  His son Jiang Shijie inherited the garden and renamed it Cultivation Garden after added the chapel of Guanyin.  In 1839 CE it was transferred to the Qixiang Office of the Saint and Silk company.  In 2000 it was inscribed on the UNESCO World Heritage List.

The garden received great acclaim in the Qing Dynasty because "all three owners...were scholars known for their integrity".  Wang Wan wrote, "enclosing walls keep the worldly uproars outside; seclusion makes the inside of the house resemble a country villa; branches of date trees are heavy with fruit over the house; the pond surface is decorated with green duckweed and red lotus."

Design 
The 3,967m2 garden is divided into an eastern section of residence and a western garden section.  Altogether the garden has 13 pavilions, 17 tablets, and 8 stelae.  The Western section is composed of several pavilions around the main  Lotus Pond, a rockery, and a smaller garden addition named The Garden of Sweet Grasses.  The structure of the garden is formed along a north to south axis which ties the three main elements of rockery, pool, and hall together.  This style of composition is also used in the Mountain Villa with Embraced Beauty.  The overall design is the simplest expression of a classical garden, there is one dominant composition, the Longevity Hall, and its associated view. The 700 m2 Lotus Pond is square with two water tails to give the illusion of infinite size.  These tails are crossed by Fish Viewing Bridge and Ferrying Beauty Bridge The former is a three-step arched bridge adjacent to the Fry Pavilion.  The latter is a natural stone bridge at the entry to the Sweet Grass Garden.  The Garden of Sweet Grasses is a scaled down version of the main garden and consists of the Sweet Grass House and Bathing Gull Pond as well as a smaller rockery.  This area is the herb (sweet grass) garden added by Wen Zhenheng.  It is meant to evoke his principal of "to leave residents free from worries, make tenants unwilling to leave, and enable visitors to throw off their tiredness".  The garden is very typical of the Ming Dynasty design aesthetic because of its clear composition in plan and the elegance and simplicity of its elements.

See also 
Chinese garden
Suzhou

Notes

References

External links 

 
 Classical Gardens of Suzhou, UNESCO's official website on World Heritage Site.

Classical Gardens of Suzhou
World Heritage Sites in China